Gallagher Convention Centre is a convention centre in Midrand, Gauteng, South Africa and is the seat of the Pan-African Parliament.

Marking its first time, Gallagher Convention Centre was the host venue for the Miss World 2009 Grand Coronation Night.

References

External links

Buildings and structures in Johannesburg
Convention centres in South Africa